Deh Soleyman (also Romanized as Deh Soleymān; also known as Soleymān Shāh) is a village in Gavrud Rural District, in the Central District of Sonqor County, Kermanshah Province, Iran. At the 2006 census, its population was 345, in 75 families.

References 

Populated places in Sonqor County